"Party to End All Parties" is a song by Australian band Skyhooks, released in April 1977 as the first and only single from the band's first compilation album, The Skyhooks Tapes. The song peaked at number 24 in Australia.

Track listing
7" single (K-6761)
 Side A "Party to End All Parties" - 2:30
 Side B "Hot Rod James" - 4:44

Charts

References 

1977 singles
Mushroom Records singles
1977 songs
Songs written by Greg Macainsh
Skyhooks (band) songs